William Watts (December 20, 1817  – May 1, 1877) was a nineteenth-century American lawyer, soldier and politician from Virginia. As a politician, Watts served in the Virginia House of Delegates and was elected to the Virginia Constitutional Convention of 1850.

Early life
Watts was born in Campbell County, Virginia in 1817. He was educated at University of Virginia where he attained an M.D. in 1840, and a Bachelor of Laws in 1841-42.

Career

As an adult, Watts began a law practice Roanoke County in 1842.

Watts was the president of the Branch Bank of Virginia from 1850-61.

In 1850, Watts was elected to the Virginia Constitutional Convention of 1850. He was one of three delegates elected from the Valley delegate district made up of his home district of Roanoke County as well as Botetourt, Alleghany and Bath Counties.

During the American Civil War, Watts served in the Confederate States Army. Initially being commissioned as Major in the 19th Virginia Infantry; in 1862 he transferred to the 28th Virginia Infantry and later became Lieutenant Colonel and Colonel.

For many years, Watts served as a director of the Atlantic, Mississippi and Ohio Railroad formed by William Mahone.

Watts served in the Virginia House of Delegates 1875-77.

Death
William Watts died in Roanoke County on May 1, 1877.

References

Bibliography

Democratic Party members of the Virginia House of Delegates
1817 births
1877 deaths
People from Campbell County, Virginia
People from Roanoke County, Virginia
University of Virginia School of Medicine alumni
People of Virginia in the American Civil War
Confederate States Army officers
19th-century American politicians
University of Virginia School of Law alumni